Adeline Sergeant (4 July 1851 – 4 December 1904) was an English writer.

Life
Born Emily Frances Adeline Sergeant at Ashbourne, Derbyshire, the second daughter of Richard Sergeant and Jane (Hall), she was home schooled until the age of thirteen, when she attended school in Weston-super-Mare. Her mother was a writer of stories for youngsters that were published under the pen name 'Adeline'; Emily later adopted this name for her own writings. At fifteen a collection of Emily's poems were published in a volume that received positive notice in Weslayan periodicals. She won a scholarship to attend Queen's College, London. Her father died in 1870, and for several years she became a governess at Riverhead, Kent.

In 1882, her novel Jacobi's wife resulted in a small award of £100, and the work was published serially in London. For the next several years her writings were serialized in the Dundee newspaper, where she lived from 1885-7. Adeline then moved to Bloomsbury, London, where she earned enough keep to support herself through her writings. In the late 1880s she developed an interest in Fabianism and the plight of the poor in London. Over her literary career, she produced over ninety novels; with some involving a religious theme. Her religious views evolved over time, including a period in the 1880s when she was briefly agnostic. Finally, she converted to Catholicism at the end of the century. Emily served as literary adviser to the publishing company R. Bentley & Sons. She frequently traveled abroad, making trips to Egypt and Palestine. In 1901 she moved to Bournemouth, where she died in 1904.

Bibliography

 Beyond recall (1882)
 Jacobi's wife (1882)
 An open foe. A romance (1884)
 No saint (1886)
 Roy's repentance; a novel (1888)
 Seventy times seven: a novel (1888)
 A life sentence: a novel (1889)
 The luck of the house: a novel (1889)
 Esther Denison (1889)
 Name and fame: a novel (1890)
 A true friend: a novel (1890)
 Brooke's daughter: a novel (1891)
 Christine; a novel (1892)
 The story of a penitent soul (1892)
 Under false pretenses (1892)
 In Vallombrosa (1894)
 The surrender of Margaret Bellarmine. A fragment (1894)
 The mistress of Quest; a novel (1895)
 Out of due season : a mezzotint (1895)
 The failure of Sibyl Fletcher: a novel (1896)
 The idol maker (1897)
 The Lady Charlotte: a novel (1897)
 Margaret Wynne (1898)
 The story of Phil Enerby (1898)
 A rise in the world; a novel (1900)
 My lady's diamonds (1901)
 This body of death (1901)
 Daunay's tower : a novel (1901)
 A soul apart (1902)
 Anthea's way (1903)
 Beneath the veil (1903)
 The passion of Paul Marillier (1908), posthumous

References

External links

 
 
 

1851 births
1904 deaths
19th-century English novelists
People from Ashbourne, Derbyshire
English women novelists
20th-century English novelists
20th-century English women writers
19th-century English women writers
19th-century British writers